is a railway station in the city of Natori, Miyagi, Japan, operated by  third-sector railway operator Sendai Airport Transit (SAT).

Lines

Station layout
The station consists of an elevated island platform serving two tracks. The station is staffed.

Adjacent stations

History
The station opened on 18 March 2007, coinciding with the opening of the Sendai Airport Line. The line was severely damaged by the 2011 Tōhoku earthquake and tsunami and service was suspended indefinitely from 11 March 2011, not reopening until 1 October, nearly 7 months later.

Passenger statistics
In fiscal 2018, the station was used by an average of 5,551 passengers daily (boarding passengers only).

Surrounding area
Sendai Airport

See also
 List of Railway Stations in Japan

References

External links

  

Railway stations in Miyagi Prefecture
Sendai Airport Line
Railway stations in Japan opened in 2007
Natori, Miyagi
Airport railway stations in Japan